Du Kui ( 180–225), courtesy name Gongliang, was a musician and official who served under the warlord Liu Biao in the late Eastern Han dynasty of China. He served in the state of Cao Wei during the Three Kingdoms period.

Life
Du Kui attempted to stop Liu Biao from performing imperial music in his own court. He was proficient in tuning the bells and other musical instruments expertise, but not in arrangement of dances and singing. With help from other court specialists, he researched old musical practices and texts and gained credit for "starting restoration of the ancient music" (yayue).

While in the service of the warlord Cao Cao, Du Kui got into an argument with Chai Yu, a bell-caster. He had forced Chai Yu to recast the bell set several times for the lack of regular pitch.

Cao Cao's successor, Cao Pi, favoured Chai Yu. Under the pretext of Du Kui's discomfort with court music for entertainment (mouth organ and zithers), Cao Pi had him dismissed. Du Kui died soon afterwards.

Legacy
Liu Xie (465–522) praised Du Kui, along with Fu Xuan (217-278) and Zhang Hua (232–300), for "correcting Caos' mistakes" (wenxin diaolong). A Song dynasty treatise by Zhu Changwen mentioned that Du Kui had a son, Du Meng. The information is nowhere corroborated.
 
Du Kui's apprentice, Chen Qi (陳頎; or Chen Hang 陳頏), was a mentor to Xun Xu (died 289), the leading court musician under Emperor Wu of the Jin dynasty.

See also
 Lists of people of the Three Kingdoms
 Kui (Chinese mythology) (legendary music master)

References

 Chen, Shou (3rd century). Records of the Three Kingdoms (Sanguozhi).
 
 
 Pei, Songzhi (5th century). Annotations to Records of the Three Kingdoms (Sanguozhi zhu).

Liu Biao and associates
Year of birth unknown
Year of death unknown
Cao Wei politicians
Politicians from Luoyang
Han dynasty musicians
Cao Wei musicians
Musicians from Luoyang